Willem Werner Hubert "Willy" Claes (born 24 November 1938) is a Belgian politician who served as the eighth Secretary General of NATO, from 1994 to 1995. Claes was forced to resign from his NATO position after he was found guilty of corruption, which was uncovered during the investigation into André Cools' death. Claes was a member of the Flemish Socialist Party.

Claes was born in Hasselt, Belgium. He graduated in political and diplomatic sciences at the Vrije Universiteit Brussel (VUB).

Political career 
Claes began his political career in the Hasselt city council. In 1968, he was elected to the national parliament. In 1972, he entered the cabinet for the first time as minister of education. Between 1973 and 1992, he was minister of economic affairs of Belgium three separate times. He also served as deputy prime minister five times, and was an important negotiator in the formation of coalition governments during the 1980s.

Claes was Minister of Foreign Affairs from 1992 until 1994, during which period he presided over Belgium's withdrawal from the UN peacekeeping mission in Rwanda during the Rwandan genocide. Belgium's withdrawal is thought to have dramatically worsened the situation on the ground, leading to thousands of deaths.

Claes was also Secretary General of NATO from 1994 until 1995, when he resigned after the discovery of a bribe of over 50 million Belgian francs (BEF), accepted at the time he was minister of economic affairs and connected to the defence contract negotiations with Agusta and Dassault. A criminal trial was handled by the Court of Cassation, which is responsible for cases involving minister in function. Claes received a 60 000 BEF fine, a three-year probationary sentence and a five-year prohibition on running for public office. An appeal at the European Court of Human Rights resulted in the confirmation of the Belgian sentence.

Honours 
 Minister of State
 Knight Grand Cross of the Order of Leopold II.

References

External links

NATO Declassified – Willy Claes (biography)
NATO's Who is Who

|-

|-

1938 births
Belgian conductors (music)
Belgian male musicians
Male conductors (music)
Belgian Ministers of State
Belgian Socialist Party politicians
Belgian socialists
Foreign ministers of Belgium
Academic staff of the Free University of Brussels (1834–1969)
Living people
Presidents of the Party of European Socialists
Recipients of the Grand Cross of the Order of Leopold II
People from Hasselt
Secretaries General of NATO
Socialistische Partij Anders politicians
21st-century conductors (music)
21st-century male musicians